Allobates humilis (common name: Bocono rocket frog) is a species of frog in the family Aromobatidae. It is endemic to western Venezuela where it is known from the Trujillo and Táchira states.
Its natural habitats are seasonal montane forest and cloud forest. This locally common frog is associated with temporary ponds. It is threatened by habitat loss; the lagoon at the type locality (near Boconó) has already disappeared.

References

humilis
Amphibians of the Andes
Amphibians of Venezuela
Endemic fauna of Venezuela
Taxa named by Juan A. Rivero
Taxonomy articles created by Polbot
Amphibians described in 1976